Melanoplus bivittatus, the two-striped grasshopper, is a poikilothermic species of grasshopper belonging to the genus Melanoplus. It is commonly found in North America, with high quantities inhabiting Canadian prairies and farmland.

Identification
A relatively large species with sizes ranging from 30 to 55 mm. A pair of pale yellow stripes running along the top of its body from above its eyes to the hind tip of its wings help to easily identify this species. This characteristic also gives this species its other common name the yellow-striped grasshopper.  The species also has a yellowish green coloration throughout its body due to chromoprotein and carotenoid. The rest of the body looks similar to that of most grasshopper species, with enlarged hind legs for jumping and two pairs of wings, with one set overlapping the other.

Life cycle
During the winter, eggs are laid in the soil and hatch by late April to early May.  At optimal conditions (25 °C, very moist), Melanoplus bivittatus will stop morphogenesis at around 21 days. Once morphogenesis is stopped, the eggs go into a state of diapause, with development continuing again in spring. Once temperatures are warm enough the eggs start hatching. Once hatching starts, the maximum rate of hatching occurs between the 10th and 13th day. At the end of development, a Melanoplus bivittatus individual will have gone through five instars.

Mating and reproduction
Melanoplus bivittatus participate in long hours of mating, with some copulation lasting up to 10 hours. The mating rituals of M.bivittatus are similar to that of red-legged grasshoppers (Melanoplus femurrubrum) in that both species receive and obtain nuptial gifts, in this case spermatophores Spermatophores are provided during the entire copulation period, which tends to be dominated mostly by male activity. Not only does long periods of copulation increase the likelihood of transferring genes, but time spent in copola can be very productive for sperm and nutrient transfer. Once the females have mated with a male they can delay mating for up to 21 days. Females will often refrain from rejecting males due to the benefits gained from the protein and fitness from eating the spermatophore.

Diet
Melanoplus bivittatus are polyphagous, which means they are capable of eating a wide variety of food. The main source of food they rely on are plants such as forbs and lentil crops. This species is commonly seen eating many different types of crops on farms across North America. In times of food shortage, this species has been known to cannibalize one another. During times of colder weather (below 25 °C) Melanoplus bivittatus will not feed since fecal production is low and excrete can not be expelled. This species of Orthoptera require a diet with linoleic acid or unsaturated fatty acids, since these acids keep the organism's wings from crumpling.

Pest
Orthoptera are known pests to agricultural environments. Some species can completely ruin crops and have detrimental economic effects on farmers. Melanoplus bivittatus can cause crop damage all through their life cycle. Not only do M. bivittatus damage crops, but they tend to eat the reproductive parts of the plants (sepals, flowers, immature and mature pods), so the likelihood of regeneration or reproduction is slim.

References

External links

Two-striped Grasshopper, Agriculture and Rural Development, Gov. of Alberta
Two-striped Grasshopper, Talk about Wildlife
Species Melanoplus bivittatus - Two-Striped Grasshopper, BugGuide
Two-Striped Grasshopper, The Backyard Arthropod Project

Orthoptera of North America
Insects of the United States
Melanoplinae
Insects described in 1825